Long Point Wildlife Refuge is a wildlife refuge and nature reserve located in West Tisbury, Massachusetts.  The property is owned by The Trustees of Reservations; it has grown in size since its first purchase in 1979.

Activities
Canoe and kayak rentals are available in July and August.

Advance ticketing
In March 2020, the refuge was closed to the public because of the COVID-19 pandemic.  In June 2020, the refuge reopened, but visitors were required to purchase tickets in advance online. The advance ticketing requirement remained in place for summer 2021.

References

External links 
 The Trustees of Reservations: Long Point Wildlife Refuge
 Trail map

The Trustees of Reservations
Wildlife refuges in Massachusetts
Geography of Martha's Vineyard
Tourist attractions in West Tisbury, Massachusetts
Protected areas established in 1979
1979 establishments in Massachusetts